Tikota  is a taluka in the southern state of Karnataka, India. It is located in the Bijapur District.

Demographics
 India census, Tikota is a large village located in Bijapur Taluka of Bijapur district, Karnataka with total 2,235 families residing. The Tikota village has a population of 11,984 of which 6,111 are males while 5,873 are females as per the 2011 Census. 

In Tikota village the population of children with age 0-6 is 1,596, which makes up 13.32 % of the total population. The average sex ratio of Tikota village is 961:1,000, which is lower than the Karnataka state average of 973:1000. The child sex ratio for the Tikota as per the census is 968:1,000, higher than the Karnataka average of 948:1,000. 

As per the constitution of India and the Panchyati Raaj Act, Tikota village is administrated by a Sarpanch  who is elected representative of village.

Geography
The village is situated geographically at 16°50'28.2"N north latitude and 75°31'13.1"E east longitude.

Agriculture
The village mainly grows sugarcane, exporting grapes, pomegranate, maize, and sorghum (jawar), as well as small portions of lemon, onion and turmeric etc. Irrigation takes place via canals, bore-wells and wells.

Festivals
Every year people are celebrating Basava Jayanti Sankranti, Ugadi, Kara Hunnume, Nagara Panchami, Deepavli, Dassara and moharam many more.

Language
The main languages in Tikota are Kannada (the most prevalent), as well as Hindi and Marathi as well.

Politics
The village comes under Babaleshwar Assembly Constituency and the Bijapur Lok Sabha constituency for state and national elections, respectively.

Literacy Rate

Tikota village has lower literacy rate compared to Karnataka overall. In 2011, literacy rate of Tikota village was 70.02 % compared to 75.36 % in Karnataka as a whole. In Tikota, male literacy stands at 78.08 % while the female literacy rate was 61.64 %.

Telephone exchange center

 Telephone Exchange Center, Tikota
 STC Code - 08352

Post office

 Post Office, Tikota
 PINCode-586130 (Head Post Office at Tikota)

Highways

 National Highway - 12 => Vijayapur - Tikota - Athani

 State Highway - 43 => Tikota - Kanamadi - Jath

Climate and temperature

The village has a semi-arid climate. It has an average elevation of 606 metres (1988 ft) above sea level.

References

Villages in Bijapur district, Karnataka